USS Manayunk may refer to:

, was renamed Ajax 15 June 1869
, was launched 30 March 1945

United States Navy ship names